Samuel Horgan (born 20 April 1987 in Palmerston North) is a New Zealand rower and former professional racing cyclist.

During his cycling career, Horgan was best known for winning the Melbourne to Warrnambool Classic in 2013. He also won the men's time trial at the 2012 Oceania Cycling Championships. In 2019, Horgan won the New Zealand national rowing titles in the novice coxed fours and eights.

Major results

2009
 3rd  Time trial, Oceania Under-23 Road Championships
2011
 1st Overall Benchmark Homes Tour
2012
 Oceania Road Championships
1st  Time trial
6th Road race
 1st Overall Tour of Canterbury
 1st Overall Tour de Taieri
 1st Le Race
 1st Taupo to Napier
 2nd Time trial, National Road Championships
2013
 1st Overall Benchmark Homes Elite Series
 1st Overall NRS Tour of the Great South Coast
 1st Overall Tour of Canterbury
 1st Melbourne to Warrnambool Classic
 1st Sprints classification NRS Tour de Perth
 7th Overall New Zealand Cycle Classic
2014
 2nd Time trial, National Road Championships
 5th Time trial, Oceania Road Championships
2015
 4th Road race, Oceania Road Championships

References

External links 
 
 

Living people
New Zealand male cyclists
1987 births
Place of birth missing (living people)
People educated at Palmerston North Boys' High School
Sportspeople from Palmerston North